Lynds' Catalogue of Bright Nebulae is an astronomical catalogue of bright nebulae.

Objects listed in the catalogue are numbered with the prefix LBN (not to be confused with LDN, or Lynds' Catalogue of Dark Nebulae), though, many entries also have other designations, for example, LBN 974, the Orion Nebula is also known as M42 and NGC 1976.

It was originally compiled in the 1960s by Beverly Lynds. Objects in the catalogue include (among other things) the coordinates of nebulae, brightness from 1 to 6 (with 1 being the brightest and 6 being barely detectable), colour and size and cross-references to other astronomical catalogues if listed elsewhere.

See also
LBN 114.55+00.22

References

Astronomical catalogues of nebulae